Red ale can refer to two styles of beer which are some shade of red or light brown in hue:

 Irish red ale
 Flanders red ale, from Belgium